Wayne Ferreira and Yevgeny Kafelnikov were the defending champions but lost in the first round to Scott Humphries and Andrei Olhovskiy.

Jonas Björkman and Todd Woodbridge won in the final 3–6, 6–4, 6–2 against Joshua Eagle and Andrew Florent.

Seeds

Draw

Finals

Top half

Bottom half

Qualifying

Qualifying seeds

Qualifiers

Qualifying draw

First qualifier

Second qualifier

External links
 Tournament profile (ITF)
 Main draw (ATP)
 Qualifying draw (ATP)

2001 Monte Carlo Masters
Doubles